Euphorbia breviarticulata is a species of flowering plant in the family Euphorbiaceae. Euphorbia breviarticulata was described by Ferdinand Albin Pax and published in Botanische Jahrbücher für Systematik, Pflanzengeschichte und Pflanzengeographie 34: 84. 1904.

Description 
It is a perennial plant with a succulent quadrangular stem and double thorns on its edges. Bushy in shape, it reaches a size of 4.5 m in height, branched from the base, or occasionally a tree of up to 6 m, the branches are fleshy, erect and extended, the lowest are prostrate.

Habitat 
It is found in open or dense thickets of Acacia Commiphora , often forming thickets, on sandy soils, silt and remnants of coastal dunes, rocky outcrops, mixed with species of Lannea , Grewia and Sansevieria ; at an altitude of 60–1200 meters.

It has a close relationship with Euphorbia grandicornis ; and can be confused with the young Euphorbia bussei .

Distribution 
It is native to Ethiopia, Kenya, Somalia, and Tanzania.

Taxonomy 
Euphorbia is a generic name that derives from the Greek physician of King Juba II of Mauritania (52 to 50 BC - 23 ), Euphorbus, in his honor - or in allusion to his large belly - since he used Euphorbia resinifera medically. In 1753 Carlos Linnaeus assigned the name to the entire genus.

Breviarticulata is a Latin epithet that means "briefly articulated".

References 

breviarticulata